Geoffrey Pleyers is an F.R.S.–FNRS researcher and professor of sociology at Université Catholique de Louvain, Belgium., and a researcher at the Collège d'Etudes Mondiales (Paris) where he chairs the program "Social Movements in the Global Age". He is the author of the book "Alter-Globalization. Becoming Actors in the Global Age" (Cambridge, Polity, 2011).

He is the current vice-president for research of the International Sociological Association (ISA) and the past-president of the Research Committee 47 "Social classes and social movements" of the ISA.

Education
Geoffrey Pleyers holds a BA in sociology from the University of Liege (2000) and a master's degree (DEA, 2001) and a doctorate from the Ecole des Hautes Etudes en Sciences Sociales in Paris (2006).

Scholar associations
From 2014 to 2018, he was the president of the Research Committee 47 "Social classes and social movements" of the International Sociological Association. During this period, he organizes conferences on social movements in different countries including Mexico, Romania, Hong Kong, France, Belgium and Palestine.

In July 2018, he was elected vice-president for Research of the International Sociological Association, for a four-year term.

A global sociologist
Geoffrey Pleyers is a member of scientific committees of numbers of journals including the Revista Mexicana de Sociología, Sociológica, Bajo el Volcán (Puebla, México), Revista Colombiana de Sociología, Revista de Estudios Sociales (Colombia), Revista de Ciencias Sociales (Costa Rica), Temas Sociológicos (Chile), Revista de Academia Crítica (Chile), Agora/Débats Jeunesse (France), Observatorio: Journal of communication studies (Portugal), Metamorfosis. Revista sobre Adolescencia y Juventud (Spain), Recherches Sociologiques et Anthropologiques (Belgium), Politique et société (Canada).

Along his career, Geoffrey Pleyers has held visiting appointments at the London School Economics, New York University, Graduate Centre City University of New York, Universidad Nacional Autónoma de México, Universidad de Chile, Universidad Alberto Hurtado, Academia de Humanismo Cristiano, FLACSO Ecuador.

Since 2015, Geoffrey Pleyers and Breno Bringel are the editors of the web journal "Open Movements: for a global and public sociology of social movements". This joint project by the Research Committee 47 from the ISA and the website Open Democracy aims at providing critical and empirically based outlooks on social movements and new expressions of social and cultural transformations, the ones which make the media headlines and those which discreetly transform daily life and politics alike, at the local and global scales.

Research interests
His research interests include social movements, youth, food movements, and social movements in Mexico.

The underlying argument of his main book Alter-Globalization. Becoming Actors in the Global Age (Cambridge, Polity, 2010) is that current social movements develop two parallel cultures of activism in their quest for social change. One focuses on a bottom-up approach, implementing changes at the local scale and giving a prominent place to experience, subjectivity, experimentation and the local scale. The second one, the "way of reason" is based on a citizen expertise and institutional regulation.

Selected publications

Books
Alter-Globalization. Becoming Actors in the Global Age. Cambridge:Polity Press, 2011 
Movimientos sociales en el siglo XXI. Buenos Aires: CLACSO, 2018 
Forums Sociaux Mondiaux et Défis de l'Altermondialisme. Brussels: Academia, 2007,

Edited books
Alerta Global. Políticas y movimientos en tiempos de pandemia , with Breno Bringel, Buenos Aires: CLACSO, 2020. 
Protestas e indignación global. Los movimientos sociales en el nuevo orden mundial, with Breno Bringel, Buenos Aires: CLACSO, 2018. 
México en movimientos. Resistencias y alternativas, with Manuel Garza, México: Porrúa, 2018. 
Economie solidaire et mouvements sociaux, with JL Laville, E. Bucolo, Corragio, Paris: Desclée de Brouwer, 2017. 
Mouvements sociaux. Quand le sujet devient acteur, with B. Capitaine, Paris: Editions MSH, 2016. 
Social movements in Central and Eastern Europe, with I. Sava, Bucharest, Press of the University of Bucharest, 2015.
Subjectivation et désubjectivation , with M. Boucher, Paris: Editions MSH, 2017. 
La consommation critique Paris, Desclee de Brouwer, 2011. 
Movimientos sociales. De lo local a lo global. Co-edited with Sergio Zermeño & Francis Mestries. Barcelona: Anthropos & Mexico City: UAM.

Articles
The Pandemic is a Battlefield. Social movements during the COVID-19 lockdown, Journal of Civil Society, 2020. 
Ecology and the global age. A social movement perspective, in: Bringel & Dominguez eds., Global Modernity and Social Protests, London: Sage.

References

External links
Main publications
ISA Research Committee 47 "Social classes and social movements"
Review of "Alter-Globalization" by Henrietta L. Moore

1978 births
Belgian sociologists
Living people